Maol Brighde Ó hEodhusa(anglicised Maelbrighte Ó Hussey; in Latin, Brigidus Hossæus), known also as Bonaventura Hussey, Bonaventura Ó hEoghusa and Giolla Brighde Ó hEoghusa, was a Franciscan Friar, teacher, Gaelic-Irish poet and Catholic author, fl. 1608–1614.

Biography
Ó hEodhusa was born in the Diocese of Clogher, in Ulster. Some details of Giolla Brighde survive. He was a member of the Ó hEoghusa family of Ulster. He arrived at Louvain in 1606 and was ordained there in 1608, where he took the name Bonaventura. He was associated with Flaithri Ó Maolconaire. The first definite information about him dates from 1 November 1607, on which day he became one of the original members of the Irish Franciscans at their college of St. Anthony at the University of Leuven in Flanders. It seems, however, that he had previously been at Douai in northern France. At Louvain, he lectured first in philosophy and afterwards in theology.

Ó hEodhusa's fame rests upon his profound knowledge of the history and language of Ireland, for which, according to the chronicles of his order, he was even in his own time held in high esteem. Ó hEodhusa remained as guardian of the college at Leuven until his death in 1614.

Writings
As far as we know, his works were all written in Irish, and one of his writings, "A Christian Catechism" (Leuven, 1608), was the first book printed on the Continent in the Irish character. The book must have met with considerable success, for it was several times reprinted and revised.

Among his other works are to be mentioned:
a metrical abridgment in 240 verses of the Catholic Catechism
a poem for a friend who had fallen into heresy
a poem on the author entering the Order of St. Francis
three or four poems preserved in manuscript in the British Museum and the Royal Irish Academy.

A letter in Irish from him to a Father Nugent, the superior of the Irish Jesuits, is printed in Rev. E. Hogan's "Hibernia Ignatiana" (p. 167).

See also
 Aengus Ó hEodhasa

References

External links
 http://www.irishtimes.com/ancestor/surname/index.cfm?fuseaction=Go.&UserID=
 http://celt.ucc.ie/itbardic.html#mathoh
 http://bill.celt.dias.ie/vol4/displayObject.php?TreeID=455&TypeID=4
 http://www.celt.dias.ie/publications/celtica/c24/c24-239-251.pdf

16th-century births
1614 deaths
Irish Franciscans
Irish writers
Irish-language poets
Irish Catholic poets
People from County Tyrone
Poet priests
16th-century Irish poets
16th-century Irish Roman Catholic priests
Irish expatriates in Belgium
Academic staff of the Old University of Leuven